Miss Grand United States 2017 was the second edition of the Miss Grand United States pageant, held on July 25, 2017, at the Leonard Nimoy Thalia, Symphony Space, New York City. Contestants from seventeen U.S. states competed for the title, of whom the representative of California, Taylor Kessler, was announced the winner. She then represented the United States at Miss Grand International 2017 in Vietnam, but did not qualify to the top 10 finalists.

Results

Contestants
All 17 titleholders have been crowned.

References

External links

Official Website
 

United States
Recurring events established in 2016
Beauty pageants in the United States